Stizocera jassuara is a species of beetle in the family Cerambycidae. It was described by Martins and Napp in 1983.

References

Stizocera
Beetles described in 1983